The 1960 Idaho Vandals football team represented the University of Idaho in the 1960 NCAA University Division football season. Led by seventh-year head coach Skip Stahley, the Vandals were an independent in the NCAA's University Division and had a 1–9 record. Two home games were played on campus at Neale Stadium in Moscow, with one in Boise at Bronco Stadium at Boise Junior College.

The Vandals suffered a sixth straight loss in the Battle of the Palouse with neighbor Washington State, falling 7–18 at Neale Stadium in  In the rivalry game with Montana in Missoula, the Vandals lost the Little Brown Stein for the first time in a decade.

Since the disbanding of the Pacific Coast Conference in the spring of 1959, Idaho had just one win per season as an independent. Stahley took on the dual role of athletic director 

Idaho played ten games, with five scheduled at night, and their only win came at Hawaii. The game was scheduled for Friday night, but due to travel delays, it was played on Sunday afternoon. The Vandals stayed on Oahu until Thursday, then flew to California for their next game, against Pacific in Stockton on Saturday night.

Schedule

All-Coast

No Vandals made the All-Coast team or the second team.  Honorable mention were tight end Reggie Carolan and quarterback Sil Vial.

NFL Draft
One player, a fourth-year junior, from the 1960 Vandals was selected in the 1961 NFL Draft:

^ Carolan was granted another year of eligibility and played for Idaho in 1961.
List of Idaho Vandals in the NFL Draft

References

External links
Gem of the Mountains: 1961 University of Idaho yearbook – 1960 football season
Go Mighty Vandals – 1960 football season
Idaho Argonaut – student newspaper – 1960 editions

Idaho
Idaho Vandals football seasons
Idaho Vandals football